is a Japanese media franchise based on the Japanese role-playing game Red Dragon by Makoto Sanda, featuring characters created by Gen Urobuchi, Kinoko Nasu, Izuki Kogyoku, Simadoriru, and Ryōgo Narita.

An anime television series titled , produced by Silver Link and Connect, aired from July 2015 to September 2015. AnimeLab has secured streaming rights in Australia & New Zealand. The franchise also includes a board game, titled Chaos Dragon: Haō Shunjū, and a role-playing game for iOS and Android devices, titled Chaos Dragon: Konton Senso, which released in 2015.

Plot
The story takes place in Huanli (the Year of Dazzling) 3015. D'natia and Kōran, two countries fighting for supremacy, are causing the world to be torn apart due to the constant war. Amidst the strife is the island country Nil Kamui, which has lost its independence. Red Dragon, the guardian god of Nil Kamui, goes out of control. Will the island country be able to regain its independence?

Chaos Dragon is based on the role-playing fiction project Red Dragon, a story which was created by five notable writers: Gen Urobuchi, Kinoko Nasu, Izuki Kogyoku, Ryōgo Narita, and Simadoriru (member of the Stripe Pattern doujin circle). The results of their tabletop role-playing game sessions over six days created material for a seven-volume light novel series.

Characters

A descendant of the royal family of Nil Kamui. He is the most pure of heart at the beginning, but learns to accept the consequences of his choices and actions. He has the power granted by the Red Dragon.

Ibuki's guardian who is fused with a demon and companion Val. She has the desire to protect Ibuki as she has promised to Mashiro. Created by Izuki Kogyoku.

A member of D'natia's prized Black Dragon Knights. Created by Kinoko Nasu.

An assassin from a religious organization in Kōran. Created by Gen Urobuchi.

A mysterious immortal trader from the independent city of Haiga. Created by Ryōgo Narita.

One of the only seven dragons in the world and the guardian deity of Nil Kamui.

Ibuki's fellow disciple in kendō.

A boy swordfighter. He lost a little sister who was like his other half, during the Seven-Year War.

Leader of the revolutionary army.

A girl who was with Ibuki at an orphanage in Nil Kamui.

Who lived in an orphanage after losing both parents in the Seven-Year War between Nil Kamui and Kōran.

A follower of Swallow.

The guardian dragon of D'natia.

The leader of the third legion of the Black Dragon Knights. He's ranked 3rd overall among the knights.

The sub-leader of the third legion of the Black Dragon Knights. She's ranked 22nd overall among the knights.

A sword that can consume the souls of killers and has the personality of a young man. Lou Zhenhua calls it "Your Highness" and keeps it in a coffin between battles because the blade will bewitch people.

A Kōran commander who excels at using the guns developed there.

A Kōran commander with mechanical body parts for use in battle.

A Kōran soldier who despises the "savage" people of Nil Kamui.

A young girl who takes orders from Lou Zhenhua. She can appear and disappear unexpectedly.

A priest from D'natia.

The new representative of Kouran's army.

A half-human under the service of Kaguraba.

A girl who is also fused with a demon under the service of Kaguraba.

The owner and driver of a giant elephant.

Ibuki's twin sister. She was thought to have been killed with Nil Kamui's previous king during the Seven-Year War. However, she suddenly reappears as D'natia's candidate to be the small country's next ruler.

Media

Anime

Episode list

References

External links
 
 

Android (operating system) games
Connect (studio)
Fantasy anime and manga
Funimation
IOS games
Japanese role-playing games
Japan-exclusive video games
Madman Entertainment anime
Films with screenplays by Shō Aikawa
Silver Link
Toho Animation
Tokyo MX original programming
Video games scored by Hitoshi Sakimoto
Video games developed in Japan